ISB may refer to:

Education
 International School of Brno, Brno, Czech Republic
 Indian School of Business, Hyderabad, Telangana, India
 International School of Business (Vietnam) Ho Chi Minh City, Vietnam
 International School Bangkok, Nonthaburi, Thailand, formerly in Bangkok
 International School Basel, Basel, Switzerland
 International School of Beaverton, Aloha, Oregon, United States
 International School of Beijing, Beijing, China
 International School of Belgrade, Belgrade, Serbia
 International School Benghazi, Benghazi, Libya
 International School of Bergen, Bergen, Norway
 International School of Boston,  Cambridge, Massachusetts, United States
 International School of Broward, Hollywood, Florida, United States
 International School of Brussels, Brussels, Belgium
 International School of Bucharest, Bucharest, Romania
 Instituto Simón Bolívar (Various countries)

Music
 I Shalt Become, an American black metal duo
 The Incredible String Band, a British folk rock musical group of the late 1960s
 International Society of Bassists, an international society dedicated to the double bass
 International Staff Band, a brass band of the Salvation Army
 International Submarine Band, American country-rock group

Religion
 Islamic Society of Baltimore, Catonsville, Maryland, United States
 Islamic Society of Boston, Boston, Massachusetts, United States
 Islamic Society of Britain, an Islamic organization

Science 
 International Society for Biocuration
 International Society of Biomechanics (Various countries)
 Institute for Systems Biology, non-profit research institute in Seattle, WA

Other uses 
 Impact Statement for Business, in UK law
 Imperial Security Bureau, the secret police force of the Empire in the Star Wars universe
 ISB Engine/Interact System B, a variant of the Cummins B Series engine used in Dodge trucks
 Independent sideband, radio modulation mode used in some AM radio transmissions
 International Socialist Bureau, the permanent organization of the Second International
Internal Security Bureau, the "TSC police"
 Islamabad International Airport, the current airport of Islamabad and Rawalpindi, Pakistan (IATA airport code: ISB)
 Benazir Bhutto International Airport, formerly Islamabad International Airport, the former airport of Islamabad and Rawalpindi, Pakistan (formerly IATA airport code: ISB)